, Plants of the World Online accepted about 660 species and hybrids in the genus Tillandsia.

A

Tillandsia abbreviata H.Luther
Tillandsia abdita L.B.Sm.
Tillandsia achyrostachys E. Morren ex Baker
Tillandsia acuminata L.B.Sm.
Tillandsia adamsii R.W. Read
Tillandsia adpressiflora Mez
Tillandsia aequatorialis L.B.Sm.
Tillandsia aeranthos (Loiseleur) L.B.Sm.
Tillandsia afonsoana T.Strehl
Tillandsia aguascalientensis Gardner
Tillandsia aizoides Mez
Tillandsia albertiana F. Vervoorst
Tillandsia albida Mez & Purpus
Tillandsia alfredo-laui Rauh & Lehmann
Tillandsia alto-mayoensis Gouda
Tillandsia alvareziae Rauh
Tillandsia andicola Griseb. ex Baker
Tillandsia andreana E. Morren ex André
Tillandsia andrieuxii (Mez) L.B.Sm.
Tillandsia angulosa Mez
Tillandsia antillana L.B.Sm.
Tillandsia appenii (Rauh) J.R.Grant
Tillandsia araujei Mez
Tillandsia archeri L.B.Sm.
Tillandsia arenicola L.B.Sm.
Tillandsia arequitae (André) André ex Mez
Tillandsia argentea Griseb.
Tillandsia argentina C.H.Wright
Tillandsia arhiza Mez
Tillandsia ariza-juliae L.B.Sm. & Jiménez
Tillandsia arroyoensis (W.Weber & Ehlers) Espejo & López-Ferrari
Tillandsia atenangoensis Ehlers & Wülfinghoff
Tillandsia atroviolacea Ehlers & Koide
Tillandsia atroviridipetala Matuda
Tillandsia aurea Mez
Tillandsia australis Mez

B

Tillandsia bagua-grandensis Rauh
Tillandsia baileyi Rose ex Small
Tillandsia bakiorum H.Luther
Tillandsia balbisiana Schultes f.
Tillandsia baliophylla Harms
Tillandsia balsasensis Rauh
Tillandsia bandensis Baker
Tillandsia × baptistana C.N.Gonç. & Azevêdo-Gonç.
Tillandsia barbeyana Wittmack
Tillandsia barclayana Baker
Tillandsia barfussii W.Till
Tillandsia barrosoae W. Till
Tillandsia barthlottii Rauh
Tillandsia bartramii Elliott
Tillandsia bella T.Strehl
Tillandsia belloensis W.Weber
Tillandsia bergeri Mez
Tillandsia × bergiana H. Takizawa & P. Koide
Tillandsia bermejoensis H. Hromadnik
Tillandsia biflora Ruiz & Pav.
Tillandsia bismarckii Rauh & Lehmann
Tillandsia bochilensis Ehlers
Tillandsia boliviana Mez
Tillandsia bongarana L.B.Sm.
Tillandsia bonita Versieux & Martinelli
Tillandsia boqueronensis Ehlers
Tillandsia borealis López-Ferrari & Espejo-Serna
Tillandsia borinquensis Cedeño-Maldonado & Proctor
Tillandsia borjaensis Manzan. & W.Till
Tillandsia botterii É.Morren ex Baker
Tillandsia bourgaei Baker
Tillandsia brachycaulos Schlecht.
Tillandsia brachyphylla Baker
Tillandsia brealitoensis L. Hromadnik
Tillandsia brenneri Rauh
Tillandsia brevicapsula Gilmartin
Tillandsia brevilingua Mez ex Harms
Tillandsia brevior L.B.Sm.
Tillandsia breviturneri Betancur & N. García
Tillandsia buchlohii Rauh
Tillandsia bulbosa Hook.
Tillandsia buseri Mez
Tillandsia butzii Mez

C

Tillandsia caballosensis Ehlers
Tillandsia cacticola L.B.Sm.
Tillandsia caerulea Kunth
Tillandsia cajamarcensis Rauh
Tillandsia calcicola L.B.Sm. & Proctor
Tillandsia califani Rauh
Tillandsia caliginosa W. Till
Tillandsia callichroma L. Hromadnik
Tillandsia calochlamys Ehlers & L. Hromadnik
Tillandsia calothyrsus Mez
Tillandsia caloura Harms
Tillandsia camargoensis L. Hromadnik
Tillandsia candelifera Rohweder
Tillandsia candida Leme
Tillandsia canescens Swartz
Tillandsia capillaris Ruiz & Pav.
Tillandsia capistranoensis Ehlers & Weber
Tillandsia capitata Griseb.
Tillandsia caput-medusae E. Morren
Tillandsia cardenasii L.B.Sm.
Tillandsia carlos-hankii Matuda
Tillandsia carlsoniae L.B.Sm.
Tillandsia carminea W. Till
Tillandsia carnosa L.B.Sm.
Tillandsia carrierei André
Tillandsia carrilloi Véliz & Feldhoff
Tillandsia castelensis Leme & W.Till
Tillandsia castellanii L.B.Sm.
Tillandsia catimbauensis Leme, W. Till & J.A. Siqueira
Tillandsia caulescens Brongniart ex Baker
Tillandsia cauliflora Mez & Wercklé ex Mez
Tillandsia cauligera Mez
Tillandsia cees-goudae Gouda
Tillandsia celata Ehlers & Lautner
Tillandsia cernua L.B.Sm.
Tillandsia cerrateana L.B.Sm.
Tillandsia chaetophylla Mez
Tillandsia chalcatzingensis Gonz.-Rocha, Cerros, López-Ferr. & Espejo
Tillandsia chapalillaensis Ehlers & Lautner
Tillandsia chapeuensis Rauh
Tillandsia chartacea L.B.Sm.
Tillandsia chasmophyta Büneker, R.Pontes & K.Soares
Tillandsia chiapensis Gardner
Tillandsia chiletensis Rauh
Tillandsia chlorophylla L.B.Sm.
Tillandsia chontalensis Baker
Tillandsia churinensis Rauh
Tillandsia chusgonensis L. Hromadnik
Tillandsia circinnatioides Matuda
Tillandsia clavigera Mez
Tillandsia coalcomanensis Ehlers
Tillandsia cochabambae E. Gross & Rauh
Tillandsia coinaensis Ehlers
Tillandsia colganii Ehlers
Tillandsia colorata L.Hrom.
Tillandsia comarapaensis H.Luther
Tillandsia comitanensis Ehlers
Tillandsia compacta Griseb.
Tillandsia complanata Benth.
Tillandsia compressa Bertero ex Schultes f.
Tillandsia comulcoensis Ehlers
Tillandsia concolor L.B.Sm.
Tillandsia confertiflora André
Tillandsia confinis L.B.Sm.
Tillandsia copalaensis Ehlers
Tillandsia copanensis Rauh & Rutschmann
Tillandsia copynii Gouda
Tillandsia × cornissaensis Gouda
[[Tillandsia × correalei|Tillandsia × correalei']] H.LutherTillandsia cossonii BakerTillandsia cotagaitensis L. HromadnikTillandsia crenulipetala MezTillandsia cretacea L.B.Sm.Tillandsia crista-galli Ehlers (also spelt Tillandsia crista-gallii)Tillandsia crocata (E. Morren) BakerTillandsia cryptopoda L.B.Sm.Tillandsia cuatrecasasii L.B.Sm.Tillandsia cucaensis Wittmack
Tillandsia × cuchnichim R. Guess & V. GuessTillandsia cucullata L.B.Sm.Tillandsia curvifolia (Ehlers & Rauh) Ehlers

DTillandsia dasyliriifolia BakerTillandsia deflexa L.B.Sm.Tillandsia delicata EhlersTillandsia demissa L.B.Sm.Tillandsia denudata AndréTillandsia deppeana SteudelTillandsia dexteri H.LutherTillandsia diaguitensis CastellanosTillandsia dichromantha Hern.-Cárdenas, López-Ferr. & EspejoTillandsia dichrophylla L.B.Sm.Tillandsia didisticha (E. Morren) BakerTillandsia didistichoides MezTillandsia diguetii Mez & Roland-Gosselin ex MezTillandsia disticha Kunth
Tillandsia × donatoi LemeTillandsia dorisdaltoniae P.L. Ibisch, R. Vásquez, I.G. Vargas & W. TillTillandsia dorotheae RauhTillandsia dorotheehaseae HaseTillandsia dugesii BakerTillandsia dura BakerTillandsia durangensis Rauh & EhlersTillandsia duratii Visiani

ETillandsia ecarinata L.B.Sm.Tillandsia edithae RauhTillandsia eistetteri EhlersTillandsia eizii L.B.Sm.Tillandsia elizabethae RauhTillandsia elongata KunthTillandsia eltoniana E. PereiraTillandsia elusiva Pinzón, I.Ramírez & CarnevaliTillandsia elvirae-grossiae RauhTillandsia emergens Mez & Sodiro ex MezTillandsia engleriana WittmackTillandsia erecta Gillies ex BakerTillandsia erici EhlersTillandsia ermitae L. HromadnikTillandsia erubescens Schlecht.Tillandsia escahuascensis Espejo, López-Ferr., Ceja & A.Mend.Tillandsia espinosae L.B.Sm.Tillandsia esseriana Rauh & L.B.Sm.Tillandsia excavata L.B.Sm.Tillandsia excelsa Griseb.Tillandsia exserta FernaldTillandsia extensa Mez

FTillandsia fasciculata SwartzTillandsia fascifolia Flores-Cruz & Diego-Esc.Tillandsia fassettii L.B.Sm.Tillandsia fendleri Griseb.Tillandsia ferreyrae L.B.Sm.Tillandsia ferrisiana L.B.Sm.Tillandsia festucoides Brongniart ex MezTillandsia filifolia Schlecht. & ChamissoTillandsia flabellata BakerTillandsia flagellata L.B.Sm.Tillandsia flavobracteata MatudaTillandsia flavoviolacea GoudaTillandsia flexuosa SwartzTillandsia floresensis EhlersTillandsia floribunda Kunth
Tillandsia × floridana L.B.Sm. (T. bartramii × T. fasciculata)Tillandsia foliosa M.Martens & GaleottiTillandsia fragrans AndréTillandsia francisci W. Till & J.R. GrantTillandsia frank-hasei J.R.GrantTillandsia fresnilloensis W.Weber & EhlersTillandsia friesii MezTillandsia fuchsii W. TillTillandsia funebris CastellanosTillandsia fusiformis L.B.Sm.

GTillandsia gardneri LindleyTillandsia geissei PhilippiTillandsia geminiflora BrongniartTillandsia genseri RauhTillandsia gerd-muelleri W.WeberTillandsia gerdae EhlersTillandsia gilliesii BakerTillandsia glabrior (L.B.Sm.) Lopez-Ferrari, Espejo & I.RamirezTillandsia glauca L.B.Sm.Tillandsia globosa WawraTillandsia glossophylla L.B.Sm.Tillandsia gracillima L.B.Sm.Tillandsia graebeneri MezTillandsia grandispica EhlersTillandsia grao-mogolensis SilveiraTillandsia grazielae Sucre & R.BragaTillandsia grossispicata Espejo, López-Ferr. & W.TillTillandsia grovesiae Manzan. & W.TillTillandsia gruberi (Ehlers) J.R.GrantTillandsia guatemalensis L.B.Sm.Tillandsia guelzii RauhTillandsia guenther-nolleri EhlersTillandsia guerreroensis RauhTillandsia gutteana W.WeberTillandsia gymnobotrya Baker

HTillandsia hammeri Rauh & EhlersTillandsia hansonii Manzan. & GoudaTillandsia harrisii EhlersTillandsia hasei Ehlers & L. HromadnikTillandsia hegeri EhlersTillandsia heliconioides KunthTillandsia helmutii L. HromadnikTillandsia hemkeri RauhTillandsia heterandra AndréTillandsia heteromorpha MezTillandsia heterophylla E. MorrenTillandsia heubergeri EhlersTillandsia hildae RauhTillandsia hintoniana L.B.Sm.Tillandsia hirta W. Till & L. HromadnikTillandsia hirtzii RauhTillandsia hoeijeri H.LutherTillandsia hofackeri EhlersTillandsia hondurensis RauhTillandsia horstii RauhTillandsia hotteana UrbanTillandsia huajuapanensis Ehlers & LautnerTillandsia huamelulaensis EhlersTillandsia huarazensis Ehlers & W. TillTillandsia hubertiana MatudaTillandsia humilis Presl

ITillandsia ignesiae MezTillandsia ilseana W. Till, Halbritter & ZecherTillandsia imperialis E. Morren ex RoezlTillandsia imporaensis EhlersTillandsia incarnata KunthTillandsia indigofera Mez & SodiroTillandsia inopinata Espejo, López-Ferr. & W.TillTillandsia intermedia MezTillandsia interrupta MezTillandsia intumescens L.B.Sm.Tillandsia ionantha PlanchonTillandsia ionochroma André ex MezTillandsia itatiensis E.H.Souza & Leodeg.Tillandsia itaubensis T.StrehlTillandsia ixioides Griseb.Tillandsia izabalensis Pinzón, I.Ramírez & Carnevali

J

Tillandsia × jaguactalensis I. Ramírez, Carnevali & Chi
Tillandsia jaliscopinicola L.Hrom. & P.Schneid. (also spelt Tillandsia jalisco-pinicola)
Tillandsia jequiensis L.Hrom. & H.Hrom.
Tillandsia joel-mandimboensis Flores-Cruz, C.Granados & Vázq.-Hurt.
Tillandsia jonesii T.Strehl
Tillandsia jucunda Castellanos
Tillandsia juerg-rutschmannii Rauh
Tillandsia juncea (Ruiz & Pav.) Poiret

K

Tillandsia kalmbacheri Matuda
Tillandsia kammii Rauh
Tillandsia karineae Manzan., Gouda & Raack
Tillandsia karwinskyana Schultes f.
Tillandsia kauffmannii Ehlers
Tillandsia kautskyi E. Pereira
Tillandsia kegeliana Mez
Tillandsia kentii (H.Luther & K.F.Norton) Manzan. & W.Till
Tillandsia kessleri H.Luther
Tillandsia kickiae Raack, Manzan. & Gouda
Tillandsia kirchhoffiana Wittmack
Tillandsia kirschnekii Rauh & W. Till
Tillandsia klausii Ehlers
Tillandsia koehresiana Ehlers
Tillandsia koideae Rauh & E. Gross
Tillandsia kolbii W. Till & Schatzl
Tillandsia krahnii Rauh
Tillandsia kretzii Ehlers & Lautner
Tillandsia krukoffiana L.B.Sm.
Tillandsia kuntzeana Mez
Tillandsia kuzmae Ehlers

L

Tillandsia lagunaensis Ehlers
Tillandsia lajensis André
Tillandsia lampropoda L.B.Sm.
Tillandsia landbeckii Philippi
Tillandsia langlasseana Mez
Tillandsia latifolia Meyen
Tillandsia laui Matuda
Tillandsia lautneri Ehlers
Tillandsia lechneri W.Till & Barfuss
Tillandsia leiboldiana Schlecht.
Tillandsia leonamiana E. Pereira
Tillandsia lepidosepala L.B.Sm.
Tillandsia leucolepis L.B.Sm.
Tillandsia leucopetala Büneker, R.Pontes & Witeck
Tillandsia limae L.B.Sm.
Tillandsia limarum E. Pereira
Tillandsia limbata Schlecht.
Tillandsia linearis Vellozo
Tillandsia lineatispica Mez
Tillandsia lithophila L. Hromadnik
Tillandsia loliacea Martius ex Schultes f.
Tillandsia loma-blancae Ehlers & Lautner
Tillandsia longifolia Baker
Tillandsia longiscapa Leme & W.Till
Tillandsia lopezii L.B.Sm.
Tillandsia lorentziana Griseb.
Tillandsia lotteae H. Hromadnik
Tillandsia loxensis N.Jaram., Manzan. & A.M.Gut.
Tillandsia loxichaensis Ehlers
Tillandsia lucida E. Morren ex Baker
Tillandsia lutheri (Manzan. & W.Till) J.R.Grant
Tillandsia lydiae Ehlers
Tillandsia lymanii Rauh

M

Tillandsia macbrideana L.B.Sm.
Tillandsia macdougallii L.B.Sm.
Tillandsia machupicchuensis Gouda & J.Ochoa
Tillandsia macrochlamys Baker
Tillandsia macrodactylon Mez
Tillandsia maculata Ruiz & Pav.
Tillandsia macvaughii Espejo & López-Ferrari
Tillandsia magnispica Espejo & López-Ferr.
Tillandsia magnusiana Wittmack
Tillandsia makoyana Baker
Tillandsia makrinii L. Hromadnik
Tillandsia mallemontii Glaziou ex Mez
Tillandsia malyi L. Hromadnik
Tillandsia malzinei (É.Morren) Baker
Tillandsia mantiqueirae Paixão-Souza, N.G.Silva & R.J.V.Alves
Tillandsia manzanilloensis Gouda
Tillandsia marabascoensis Ehlers & Lautner
Tillandsia marcalaensis Rauh & E.Gross
Tillandsia × marceloi H. Takizawa & P. Koide
Tillandsia marconae W. Till & Vitek
Tillandsia maritima Matuda
Tillandsia markusii L. Hromadnik
Tillandsia marnieri-lapostollei Rauh (also spelt Tillandsia marnieri-apostollei)
Tillandsia mateoensis Ehlers
Tillandsia matudae L.B.Sm.
Tillandsia mauryana L.B.Sm.
Tillandsia may-patii I. Ramírez & Carnevali
Tillandsia maya I. Ramírez & Carnevali
Tillandsia mazatlanensis Rauh
Tillandsia mereliana Schinini
Tillandsia micans L.B.Sm.
Tillandsia milagrensis Leme
Tillandsia mima L.B.Sm.
Tillandsia minasgeraisensis Ehlers & W. Till. 
Tillandsia minutiflora Donadio
Tillandsia mirabilis L. Hromadnik
Tillandsia mitlaensis Weber & Ehlers
Tillandsia mixtecorum Ehlers & Koide
Tillandsia mollis H. Hromadnik & W. Till
Tillandsia montana Reitz
Tillandsia mooreana L.B.Sm.
Tillandsia moronesensis Ehlers
Tillandsia moscosoi L.B.Sm.
Tillandsia muhriae W.Weber
Tillandsia multicaulis Steudel
Tillandsia myosura Griseb. ex Baker

N

Tillandsia nana Baker
Tillandsia nayelyana R.García Mart. & Beutelsp.
Tillandsia neglecta E. Pereira
Tillandsia nervata L.B.Sm.
Tillandsia nervisepala (Gilmartin) L.B.Sm.
Tillandsia nicolasensis Ehlers
Tillandsia × nidus Rauh & Lehmann
Tillandsia nizandaensis Ehlers
Tillandsia nolleriana Ehlers
Tillandsia novakii H.Luther
Tillandsia nuptialis R. Braga & Sucre
Tillandsia nuyooensis Ehlers

O

Tillandsia oaxacana L.B.Sm.
Tillandsia oblivata L. Hromadnik
Tillandsia occulta H.Luther
Tillandsia oerstediana L.B.Sm.
Tillandsia oliveirae E.H.Souza & Leme
Tillandsia orbicularis L.B.Sm.
Tillandsia organensis Ehlers
Tillandsia orogenes Standley & L.O. Williams
Tillandsia oropezana L. Hromadnik
Tillandsia oroyensis Mez
Tillandsia ortgiesiana E. Morren ex Mez
Tillandsia ovatispicata Gouda
Tillandsia oxapampae Rauh & von Bismarck

P

Tillandsia pachyaxon L.B.Sm.
Tillandsia pacifica Ehlers
Tillandsia paleacea Presl
Tillandsia pallescens Betancur & N. García
Tillandsia pamelae Rauh
Tillandsia pampasensis Rauh
Tillandsia paniculata (L.) L.
Tillandsia paraensis Mez
Tillandsia paraibensis R.A.Pontes
Tillandsia paraisoensis Ehlers
Tillandsia pardoi Gouda
Tillandsia parryi Baker
Tillandsia parvispica Baker
Tillandsia pastensis André
Tillandsia paucifolia Baker
Tillandsia pedicellata (Mez) Castellanos
Tillandsia peiranoi Castellanos
Tillandsia penascoensis Ehlers & Lautner
Tillandsia pentasticha Rauh & Wülfinghoff
Tillandsia pfeufferi Rauh
Tillandsia pfisteri Rauh
Tillandsia piauiensis Ehlers & J.Claus
Tillandsia piepenbringii (Rauh) J.R.Grant
Tillandsia pinicola I. Ramírez & Carnevali
Tillandsia pinnatodigitata Mez
Tillandsia piurensis L.B.Sm.
Tillandsia plagiotropica Rohweder
Tillandsia platyphylla Mez
Tillandsia plumosa Baker
Tillandsia pohliana Mez
Tillandsia polita L.B.Sm.
Tillandsia polyantha Mez & Sodiro
Tillandsia polystachia (L.) L.
Tillandsia polzii Ehlers
Tillandsia pomacochae Rauh
Tillandsia ponderosa L.B.Sm.
Tillandsia porongoensis L. Hromadnik & P. Schneider
Tillandsia portillae E. Gross & Wülfinghoff
Tillandsia porvenirensis Ehlers
Tillandsia praschekii Ehlers & Willinger
Tillandsia pringlei S.Watson
Tillandsia prodigiosa (Lemaire) Baker
Tillandsia prolata (H.Luther) Gouda & Barfuss
Tillandsia propagulifera Rauh
Tillandsia pruinosa Swartz
Tillandsia pseudobaileyi Gardner
Tillandsia pseudocardenasii W.Weber
Tillandsia pseudofloribunda Gouda
Tillandsia pseudomacbrideana Rauh
Tillandsia pseudomicans Rauh
Tillandsia pseudomontana W.Weber & Ehlers
Tillandsia pseudooaxacana Ehlers
Tillandsia pseudosetacea Ehlers & Rauh
Tillandsia pucaraensis Ehlers
Tillandsia pueblensis L.B.Sm.
Tillandsia punctulata Schlecht. & Chamisso
Tillandsia purpurascens Rauh
Tillandsia purpurea Ruiz & Pav.
Tillandsia pyramidata André

Q

Tillandsia quaquaflorifera Matuda
Tillandsia queretaroensis Ehlers
Tillandsia queroensis Gilmartin

R

Tillandsia raackii H.Luther
Tillandsia racinae L.B.Sm.
Tillandsia ramellae W. Till & S. Till
Tillandsia rangelensis Hechav.
Tillandsia rariflora André
Tillandsia rauhii L.B.Sm.
Tillandsia rauschii Rauh & Lehmann
Tillandsia reclinata E. Pereira & Martinelli
Tillandsia rectangula Baker
Tillandsia × rectifolia C.A. Wiley
Tillandsia recurvata (L.) L.
Tillandsia recurvifolia Hook.
Tillandsia recurvispica L. Hromadnik & P. Schneider
Tillandsia reducta L.B.Sm.
Tillandsia reichenbachii Baker
Tillandsia religiosa Hern.-Cárdenas et al.
Tillandsia remota Wittmack
Tillandsia renateae Gouda, Manzan. & Raack
Tillandsia renateehlersiae Leme & Gouda
Tillandsia restrepoana André
Tillandsia retorta Griseb. ex Baker
Tillandsia rettigiana Mez
Tillandsia reuteri Rauh
Tillandsia reversa L.B.Sm.
Tillandsia rhodocephala Ehlers & Koide
Tillandsia rhodosticta L.B.Sm.
Tillandsia rhomboidea André
Tillandsia riohondoensis Ehlers
Tillandsia riverae Manzan. & W.Till
Tillandsia rodrigueziana Mez
Tillandsia roezlii E. Morren
Tillandsia rohdenardinii Strehl
Tillandsia roland-gosselinii Mez
Tillandsia romeroi L.B.Sm.
Tillandsia rosacea L. Hromadnik & W. Till
Tillandsia rosarioae L. Hromadnik
Tillandsia roseiflora Ehlers & W.Weber
Tillandsia roseoscapa Matuda
Tillandsia roseospicata Matuda
Tillandsia rothii Rauh
Tillandsia rotundata (L.B.Sm.) Gardner
Tillandsia rubella Baker
Tillandsia rubia Ehlers & L. Colgan
Tillandsia rubrispica Ehlers & Koide
Tillandsia rubroviolacea Rauh
Tillandsia rudolfii E. Gross & Hase
Tillandsia rusbyi Baker

S

Tillandsia sagasteguii L.B.Sm.
Tillandsia salmonea Ehlers
Tillandsia samaipatensis W. Till
Tillandsia sangii Ehlers
Tillandsia santiagoensis H.Hrom. & L.Hrom.
Tillandsia santieusebii Morillo & Oliva-Esteva
Tillandsia santosiae Ehlers
Tillandsia sceptriformis Mez & Sodiro ex Mez
Tillandsia schatzlii Rauh
Tillandsia schiedeana Steudel
Tillandsia schimperiana Wittmack
Tillandsia schreiteri Lillo & A.Cast.
Tillandsia schultzei Harms
Tillandsia schusteri Rauh
Tillandsia secunda Kunth
Tillandsia seideliana E. Pereira
Tillandsia seleriana Mez
Tillandsia selleana Harms
Tillandsia sessemocinoi Lopez-Ferrari, Espejo & P. Blanco
Tillandsia setacea Swartz
Tillandsia setiformis Ehlers
Tillandsia sierrahalensis Espejo & López-Ferrari
Tillandsia sierrajuarezensis Matuda
Tillandsia sigmoidea L.B.Sm.
Tillandsia simulata Small
Tillandsia × smalliana H.Luther (T. balbisiana × T. fasciculata) – regarded as "unplaced" by Plants of the World Online
Tillandsia socialis L.B.Sm.
Tillandsia sodiroi Mez
Tillandsia somnians L.B.Sm.
Tillandsia spathacea Mez & Sodiro
Tillandsia sphaerocephala Baker
Tillandsia spiraliflora Rauh
Tillandsia spiralipetala Gouda
Tillandsia sprengeliana Klotzsch ex Mez
Tillandsia standleyi L.B.Sm.
Tillandsia steiropoda L.B.Sm.
Tillandsia stellifera L. Hromadnik
Tillandsia stenoura Harms
Tillandsia stipitata L.B.Sm.
Tillandsia stoltenii Ehlers & E.Gross
Tillandsia straminea Kunth
Tillandsia streptocarpa Baker
Tillandsia streptophylla Scheidweiler ex E. Morren
Tillandsia stricta Solander
Tillandsia subconcolor L.B.Sm.
Tillandsia subinflata L.B.Sm.
Tillandsia subteres H.Luther
Tillandsia subulifera Mez
Tillandsia sucrei E. Pereira
Tillandsia sueae Ehlers
Tillandsia suescana L.B.Sm.
Tillandsia suesilliae Espejo, López-Ferrari & W. Till
Tillandsia superba Mez & Sodiro
Tillandsia superinsignis Matuda
Tillandsia supermexicana Matuda

T

Tillandsia tafiensis (L.B.Sm.) Gouda
Tillandsia takizawae Ehlers & H.Luther
Tillandsia taxcoensis Ehlers
Tillandsia tecolometl Granados, Flores-Cruz & Salazar
Tillandsia tecpanensis Ehlers & Lautner
Tillandsia tectorum E. Morren
Tillandsia tehuacana I. Ramírez & Carnevali
Tillandsia teloloapanensis Ehlers & Lautner
Tillandsia tenebra L. Hromadnik & W. Till
Tillandsia tenuifolia L.
Tillandsia teres L.B.Sm.
Tillandsia thiekenii Ehlers
Tillandsia thyrsigera E. Morren ex Baker
Tillandsia tillii Ehlers
Tillandsia tomekii L. Hromadnik
Tillandsia tonalaensis Ehlers
Tillandsia toropiensis Rauh
Tillandsia tortilis Klotzsch ex Baker
Tillandsia tovarensis Mez
Tillandsia tragophoba Dillon
Tillandsia trauneri L. Hromadnik
Tillandsia trelawniensis Proctor
Tillandsia tricholepis Baker
Tillandsia tricolor Schlecht. & Chamisso
Tillandsia trigalensis Ehlers
Tillandsia truxillana L.B.Sm.
Tillandsia turneri Baker
Tillandsia turquinensis Willinger & Michlek

U

Tillandsia ulrici Ehlers
Tillandsia ultima L.B.Sm.
Tillandsia uruguayensis Rossado
Tillandsia usneoides (L.) L.
Tillandsia utriculata L.

V

Tillandsia × vandenbergii Ehlers & Hase
Tillandsia variabilis Schlecht.
Tillandsia velutina Ehlers
Tillandsia ventanaensis Ehlers & Koide
Tillandsia verapazana Ehlers
Tillandsia vernicosa Baker
Tillandsia vicentina Standley
Tillandsia violacea Baker
Tillandsia violaceiflora L.Hrom.
Tillandsia violascens Mez
Tillandsia virescens Ruiz & Pav.
Tillandsia vriesioides Matuda

W

Tillandsia walter-richteri W.Weber
Tillandsia walter-tillii J.R.Grant
Tillandsia walteri Mez
Tillandsia weberi L. Hromadnik & P. Schneider
Tillandsia welzii Ehlers
Tillandsia werdermannii Harms
Tillandsia werner-rauhiana Koide & Takiz.
Tillandsia werneriana J.R.Grant
Tillandsia × wilinskii Gouda
Tillandsia winkleri T.Strehl
Tillandsia witeckii Büneker, R.Pontes & K.Soares
Tillandsia wuelfinghoffii Ehlers
Tillandsia wurdackii L.B.Sm.

X

Tillandsia xerographica Rohweder
Tillandsia xiphioides Ker-Gawler

Y

Tillandsia yerba-santae Ehlers
Tillandsia yuncharaensis W. Till
Tillandsia yunckeri L.B.Sm.
Tillandsia yutaninoensis Ehlers & Lautner

Z

Tillandsia zacapanensis Véliz & Feldhoff
Tillandsia zacualpanensis Ehlers & Wülfinghoff
Tillandsia zaragozaensis Ehlers
Tillandsia zaratensis W.Weber
Tillandsia zarumensis Gilmartin
Tillandsia zecheri W. Till
Tillandsia zoquensis Ehlers

Former species
Species formerly placed in Tillandsia include:

Billbergia amoena (Lodd. et al.) Lindl. (as T. amoena Lodd. et al.)
Billbergia distachia (Vell.) Mez (as T. distachia Vell.)
Catopsis berteroniana (Schult. & Schult.f.) Mez (as T. berteroniana Schult. & Schult.f.)
Cipuropsis amicorum (I.Ramírez & Bevil.) Gouda (as T. amicorum I. Ramírez & Bevilacqua)
Cryptanthus acaulis (Lindl.) Beer (as T. acaulis Lindl.)
Deuterocohnia brevifolia (Griseb.) M.A.Spencer & L.B.Sm. (as T. chlorantha Speg.)
Guzmania lingulata (L.) Mez (as T. lingulata L.)
Guzmania musaica (Linden & André) Mez (as T. musaica Linden & André)
Josemania asplundii (L.B.Sm.) W.Till & Barfuss (as T. asplundii L.B.Sm.)
Josemania singularis (Mez & Wercklé) W.Till & Barfuss (as T. singularis Mez & Wercklé)
Josemania truncata (L.B.Sm.) Christenh. & Byng (as T. truncata L.B.Sm.)
Pseudalcantarea grandis (Schltdl.) Pinzón & Barfuss (as T. grandis Schlecht.)
Pseudalcantarea viridiflora (Beer) Pinzón & Barfuss (as T. viridiflora (Beer) Baker)
Racinaea dielsii (Harms) H.Luther (as T. dielsii Harms)
Racinaea pallidoflavens (Mez) M.A.Spencer & L.B.Sm. (as T. pallidoflavens Mez)
Racinaea pendulispica (Mez) M.A.Spencer & L.B.Sm. (as T. pendulispica Mez)
Racinaea undulifolia (Mez) H.Luther (as T. undulifolia Mez)
Vriesea ensiformis (Vell.) Beer (as T. ensiformis Vell.)
Vriesea gigantea Gaudich. (as T. tessellata Linden)
Vriesea myriantha (Baker) Betancur (as Tillandsia myriantha Baker)
Vriesea psittacina (Hook.) Lindl. (as T. psittacina Hook.)
Vriesea regina (Vell.) Beer (as T. regina Vell.)
Vriesea splendens (Brongn.) Lem. (as T. splendens Brongn.)
Werauhia insignis (Mez) W.Till, Barfuss & M.R.Samuel (as T. insignis (Mez) L.B.Sm. & Pittendr.)

References

External links

 List
Tillandsia